Katy Days Festival is a railroad themed festival held annually during the Memorial Day Weekend in Parsons, Kansas at Forest Park. It commemorates the arrival of the first Missouri–Kansas–Texas train.

Music festivals in Kansas